Derrick Goh Soon Hee (born 1968) is a Singaporean politician and banker. A member of the governing People's Action Party (PAP), he has been the Member of Parliament (MP) representing the Nee Soon Link division of Nee Soon GRC since 2020.

Early life and education 
Goh was born into a family of three siblings. He graduated from Nanyang Technological University with a Bachelor of Accountancy (with Honours) in 1992. Goh obtained a Master of Business Administration (with Honours) in Finance at The Wharton School in 2006 under a scholarship from American Express (Amex).

Career 
Goh spent more than ten years at American Express, and was based in London and New York. Goh joined DBS Bank in 2008, and was its Chief Operating Officer for Institutional Banking Group before becoming the head of its subsidiary, POSB Bank, on 1 October 2012.  On 9 March 2016, Goh became the managing director and regional head of DBS Treasures Private Client and DBS Treasures. He became the managing director and the head of audit at DBS Bank at the start of 2018.

Since 2013, Goh has been volunteering as a district councillor with the South West Community Development Council.

Politics 
Goh was fielded in the 2020 general election to contest in Nee Soon Group Representation Constituency (GRC), on the People's Action Party's ticket against the Progress Singapore Party. His running mates were K. Shanmugam, Louis Ng, Faishal Ibrahim, and Carrie Tan. On 11 July 2020, Goh and team were declared to be elected to represent Nee Soon GRC in the 14th Parliament of Singapore, garnering 61.9% of the valid votes.

On 1 September 2020, Goh gave his maiden parliamentary speech where he used examples of residents' feedback on Self-Employed Person Income Relief Scheme (SIRS), as part of COVID-19 Solidarity budget in Singapore, to highlight the importance of good implementation with good policies

Personal life 
Goh is married with three children.

References

External links
 Derrick Goh on Parliament of Singapore

Living people
Singaporean bankers
Nanyang Technological University alumni
People's Action Party politicians
1968 births
Members of the Parliament of Singapore